Nurettin Gazi Misirli (born Gazwan Masri, Aleppo, Syria 1964) is a Syrian-Turkish businessman. Misirli left Syria in 1983, settled in neighboring Turkey in 1987, and changed his name.  He came to Turkeyfor a university education, and after graduation married a Turkish woman. He obtained Turkish nationality and started his own business.

Misirli became head of the Santral Group, which describes itself as “supplying products and goods from Turkish and international markets and marketing them in the Arab world”. The conglomerate also specializes in real estate. In 1988, Misirli joined the Turkish Islamist business association known as  MÜSİAD (Turkish acronym: Independent Industrialists and Businessmen Association).

A 2011 Turkish media report cited the then-Syrian ambassador to Turkey as identifying Misirli as close to now-President Recep Tayyip Erdoğan, who was said to call him "the financer of most of the actions."

References

Living people
1964 births
People from Aleppo